Pušovce is a village and municipality in Prešov District in the Prešov Region of eastern Slovakia.

Name
The name comes from a personal name Puš – a founder of the settlement and owner of the property.

History
In historical records the village was first mentioned in 1352.

Geography

Population 
It has a population of 526 people (2020-12-31).

References

Citations

Bibliography

External links
http://www.statistics.sk/mosmis/eng/run.html

Villages and municipalities in Prešov District
Šariš